This is a list of rural localities in Volgograd Oblast. Volgograd Oblast (Volgogradskaya oblast) is a federal subject (an oblast) of Russia, located in the Volga region of Southern Russia. Its administrative center is Volgograd. The population of the oblast was 2,610,161 in the 2010 Census.

Alexeyevsky District 
Rural localities in Alexeyevsky District:

 Alexeyevskaya
 Andreyanovka
 Arepyev
 Arzhanovskaya
 Barminsky
 Bolshaya Tavolzhanka
 Bolshoy Babinsky
 Checherovsky
 Gushchinsky
 Isakiyevsky
 Kochkarinsky
 Krasinsky
 Krasny Oktyabr
 Kudinovsky
 Larinsky
 Lunyakinsky
 Mitkin
 Nesterovsky
 Olkhovsky
 Pimkinsky
 Plyos
 Podpesochny
 Poklonovsky
 Polyanovsky
 Pomalinsky
 Popov
 Rechensky
 Reshetovsky
 Ryabovsky
 Samolshinsky
 Serebryansky
 Sharashensky
 Sidorovka
 Skulyabinsky
 Solontsovsky
 Stanovsky
 Stezhensky
 Sukhovsky
 Titovsky
 Tryokhlozhinsky
 Ugolsky
 Ust-Buzulukskaya
 Yaminsky
 Yaminsky
 Yendovsky
 Yezhovka
 Zakharovsky
 Zotovskaya

Bykovsky District 
Rural localities in Bykovsky District:

 Alexandrovka
 Demidov
 Katrichev
 Krasnye Zori
 Lugovaya Proleyka
 Molodyozhny
 Nizhny Balykley
 Primorsk
 Sadovoye
 Verkhny Balykley
 Zavolzhsky
 Zelyony

Chernyshkovsky District 
Rural localities in Chernyshkovsky District:

 Akolzin
 Alyoshkin
 Aseyev
 Basakin
 Baznoy
 Biryukov
 Bogomazovka
 Bolsheternovoy
 Cherkomasyev
 Filatov
 Firsovka
 Gladkov
 Komarov
 Krasnoyarsky
 Krasny Bogdan
 Krasny
 Lagutin
 Loznoy
 Makarovsky
 Maloternovoy
 Minayev
 Morskoy
 Nizhnegnutov
 Nizhnyaya Verbovka
 Nizyanka
 Parshino
 Popov
 Pristenovsky
 Razdolny
 Rossoshansky
 Sizov
 Sokolov
 Tormosin
 Verkhnegnutov
 Verlhnetsimlyansky
 Vodyanovsky
 Volotsky
 Vorobyov
 Yarskoy
 Yolkino
 Zakharov
 Zhuravka

Danilovsky District 
Rural localities in Danilovsky District:

 Atamanovka
 Belye Prudy
 Beryozovskaya
 Bobry
 Chernorechensky
 Dorozhkin
 Filin
 Gonchary
 Gorin
 Gryaznukha
 Kamennochernovsky
 Kamenny
 Kiyevsky
 Krasny
 Kuvshinov
 Loboykovo
 Lovyagin
 Medvedevo
 Miusovo
 Orekhovo
 Ostrovskaya
 Petrushi
 Plotnikov 1-y
 Popov
 Profsoyuznik
 Prydki
 Rogachi
 Semibratovsky
 Sergiyevskaya
 Tarasov
 Velichkin
 Zaplavka
 Zapolyansky

Dubovsky District 
Rural localities in Dubovsky District:

 Boykiye Dvoriki
 Chelyuskinets
 Davydovka
 Gornaya Proleyka
 Gornovodyanoye
 Gorny Balykley
 Karavayinka
 Loznoye
 Malaya Ivanovka
 Olenye
 Peskovatka
 Petropavlovka
 Pichuga
 Pochta
 Polunino
 Pryamaya Balka
 Rasstrigin
 Rodniki
 Sadki
 Semyonovka
 Spartak
 Strelnoshirokoye
 Suvodskaya
 Ust-Pogozhye
 Varkino

Frolovsky District 
Rural localities in Frolovsky District:

 Archedino-Chernushinsky
 Banny
 Blagodatny
 Dudachensky
 Kolobrodov
 Kudinovsky
 Lychak
 Malodelskaya
 Mansky
 Muravli
 Nizhniye Lipki
 Parizhskaya Kommuna
 Prigorodny
 Rubyozhny
 Russko-Osinovsky
 Shkolny
 Shlyakhovsky
 Zimovsky

Gorodishchensky District 
Rural localities in Gorodishchensky District:

 Borodino
 Donskoy
 Grachi
 Kamenny
 Karpovka
 Konny
 Kotluban
 Krasny Pakhar
 Kuzmichi
 Novaya Nadezhda
 Orlovka
 Panshino
 Peskovatka
 Posyolok Oblastnoy selskokhozyaystvennoy opytnoy stantsii
 Rossoshka
 Sady Pridonya
 Sakarka
 Samofalovka
 Stepnoy
 Studyono-Yablonovka
 Tsaritsyn
 Varlamov
 Vertyachy
 Vinovka
 Zapadnovka

Ilovlinsky District 
Rural localities in Ilovlinsky District:

 Alexandrovka
 Alikovka
 Avilov
 Baybayev
 Beluzhino-Koldairov
 Berdiya
 Bolshaya Ivanovka
 Borovki
 Chernozubovka
 Fastov
 Golensky
 Kachalino
 Kachalinskaya
 Kamensky
 Kamyshinsky
 Khmelevskoy
 Kolotsky
 Kondrashi
 Krasnodonsky
 Krasnoyarsky
 Kuznetsov
 Log
 Medvedev
 Nizhnegerasimovsky
 Novogrigoryevskaya
 Obilny
 Ozerki
 Peschanka
 Pisaryovka
 Rassvet
 Shirokov
 Shiryayevsky
 Shokhinsky
 Sirotinskaya
 Solodcha
 Starodonskoy
 Starogrigoryevskaya
 Tary
 Traktirsky
 Tryokhostrovskaya
 Viltov
 Yablochny
 Yablonsky
 Yeretsky
 Zavarygin
 Zheltukhin
 Zheltukhino-Shiryaysky
 Zimoveysky

Kalachyovsky District 
Rural localities in Kalachyovsky District:

 Beloglinsky
 Bereslavka
 Bolshenabatovsky
 Bratsky
 Buzinovka
 Dalny
 Dom otdykha
 Donskoy
 Golubinskaya
 Golubinsky 2-y
 Gremyachy
 Ilyevka
 Kamyshi
 Kolpachki
 Komsomolsky
 Krepinsky
 Kumovka
 Logovsky
 Lozhki
 Lyapichev
 Malogolubinsky
 Marinovka
 Morskoy
 Novolyapichev
 Novopetrovsky
 Oktyabrsky
 Osinovsky
 Ovrazhny
 Parkhomenko
 Patiizbyansky
 Pervomaysky
 Posyolok otdeleniya 2 sovkhoza Volgo-Don
 Prikanalny
 Primorsky
 Prudboy
 Pyatimorsk
 Ryumino-Krasnoyarsky
 Stepanevka
 Stepnoy
 Svetly Log
 Tikhonovka
 Verbovsky
 Volgodonskoy
 Yarki-Rubezhny
 Zarya

Kamyshinsky District 
Rural localities in Kamyshinsky District:

 Alexandrovka
 Antipovka
 Avilovsky
 Baranovka
 Belogorki
 Butkovka
 Chukhonastovka
 Dubovka
 Dvoryanskoye
 Galka
 Gosselekstantsiya
 Gryaznukha
 Guselka
 Ionov
 Kalinovka
 Karpunin
 Kostarevo
 Lebyazhye
 Michurinsky
 Nagorny
 Nizhnyaya Dobrinka
 Nizhnyaya Lipovka
 Panovka
 Petrunino
 Popovka
 Posyolok fermy 3 sovkhoza Dobrinsky
 Salomatino
 Semyonovka
 Shcherbakovka
 Shcherbatovka
 Srednyaya Kamyshinka
 Talovka
 Ternovka
 Tikhomirovka
 Torpovka
 Umet
 Ust-Gryaznukha
 Verkhnyaya Dobrinka
 Verkhnyaya Gryaznukha
 Verkhnyaya Kulaninka
 Verkhnyaya Lipovka
 Veselovo
 Vikhlyantsevo
 Vodnobuyerachnoye
 Yelshanka

Kikvidzensky District 
Rural localities in Kikvidzensky District:

 Alexandrovka
 Alontsevo
 Astakhov
 Besov
 Bezrechny
 Budyonny
 Chernolagutinsky
 Chistopol
 Dalnestepnoy
 Dubrovsky
 Gordeyevsky
 Grishin
 Kalachevsky
 Kalinovsky
 Kazarino
 Krutoy Log
 Kuzkin
 Lapin
 Lestyukhin
 Machekha
 Marchukovsky
 Mikhaylovka
 Mordvintsevo
 Mozgly
 Ozerki
 Peschanovka
 Preobrazhenskaya
 Rasstrigin
 Semyonovka
 Shiryayevsky
 Strakhov
 Uvarovka
 Yezhovka
 Zavyazka

Kletsky District 
Rural localities in Kletsky District:

 Bolshaya Doshchinka
 Bolshaya Osinovka
 Borisov
 Gvardeysky
 Ivanushensky
 Kalmykovsky
 Karazhensky
 Kazachy
 Kletskaya
 Koponya
 Kremenskaya
 Kurganny
 Lipovsky
 Logovsky
 Maksari
 Malaya Donshchinka
 Malaya Osinovka
 Manoylin
 Mayorovsky
 Melokletsky
 Mukovnin
 Nizhnyaya Buzinovka
 Novotsaritsynsky
 Orekhov
 Perekopka
 Perekopskaya
 Perelazovsky
 Platonov
 Podnizhny
 Raspopinskaya
 Saushkin
 Selivanov
 Ternovoy
 Ventsy
 Verkhnecherensky
 Verkhnyaya Buzinovka
 Yerik
 Yevstratovsky
 Zakharov
 Zhirkovsky
 Zotovsky

Kotelnikovsky District 
Rural localities in Kotelnikovsky District:

 Budarka
 Chiganaki
 Chilekovo
 Darganov
 Dorofeyevsky
 Generalovsky
 Gremyachaya
 Karayichev
 Kotelnikov
 Krasnoyarsky
 Lenina
 Mayorovsky
 Nagavskaya
 Nagolny
 Nebykov
 Nizhneyablochny
 Nizhniye Cherni
 Pimeno-Cherni
 Pokhlyobin
 Poperechny
 Primorsky
 Pugachyovskaya
 Rassvet
 Ravninny
 Safronov
 Sazonov
 Semichny
 Ternovoy
 Vasilyevsky
 Verkhneyablochny
 Vesyoly
 Vypasnoy
 Zakharov

Kotovsky District 
Rural localities in Kotovsky District:

 Avilovo
 Burluk
 Doroshevo
 Gordiyenki
 Korostino
 Kryachki
 Kuptsovo
 Lapshinskaya
 Lobynets
 Miroshniki
 Moiseyevo
 Mokraya Olkhovka
 Netkachevo
 Nizhniye Korobki
 Novoalexeyevka
 Novonikolayevka
 Pereshchepnoye
 Plemkhoz
 Popki
 Romanov
 Slyusarevo
 Smorodino
 Sosnovka
 Tarasovo
 Yefimovka

Kumylzhensky District 
Rural localities in Kumylzhensky District:

 Andreyanovsky
 Averinsky
 Belenky
 Belogorsky
 Blinkovsky
 Blizhny
 Bukanovskaya
 Bukanovskoye Zagotzerno
 Chiganaki 1-ye
 Chiganaki 2-ye
 Chunosovsky
 Dubovsky
 Fedoseyevskaya
 Filin
 Filyaty
 Galkin
 Glushitsa
 Golovsky
 Grishinsky
 Ilmenevsky
 Kalinin
 Klyuchi
 Kosoklyuchansky
 Kozlov
 Kraptsovsky
 Krasnoarmeysky
 Krasnopolov
 Krasnyansky
 Krutoy
 Kuchurovsky
 Kumylzhenskaya
 Kuznechinsky
 Lisinsky
 Lyalinsky
 Lyubishensky
 Mitkin
 Nikitinsky
 Oblivsky
 Olkhovsky
 Ostroukhov
 Podkovsky
 Pokruchinsky
 Popov
 Potapovsky
 Pustovsky
 Rodionovsky
 Samoylovsky
 Sarychevsky
 Sedov
 Shakin
 Sigayevsky
 Siskovsky
 Skurishenskaya
 Slashchyovskaya
 Sulyayevsky
 Tochilkin
 Tyurinsky
 Yarskoy 1-y
 Yarskoy 2-y
 Yelansky
 Yendovsky
 Zaolkhovsky
 Zatalovsky
 Zhukovsky
 Zhukovsky

Leninsky District 
Rural localities in Leninsky District:

 Bakhtiyarovka
 Bulgakov
 Dolgy
 Glukhoy
 Gornaya Polyana
 Karshevitoye
 Kolobovka
 Kommunar
 Konovalov
 Kovylny
 Leshchev
 Leskhoz 5-y
 Malyayevka
 Mayak Oktyabrya
 Nadezhdin
 Novostroyka
 Pokrovka
 Put Ilyicha
 Rassvet
 Saray
 Solodovka
 Stepana Razina
 Stepnoy
 Traktorostroy
 Tsarev
 Vosmoye Marta
 Zaplavnoye
 Zarya
 Zubarevka

Mikhaylovka Urban Okrug 
Rural localities in Mikhaylovka Urban Okrug:

 Abramov
 Archedinskaya
 Bezymyanka
 Bolshaya Glushitsa
 Bolshemedvedevsky
 Bolshoy Oreshkin
 Bolshoy
 Burov
 Cheremukhov
 Demochkin
 Frolov
 Glinishche
 Grishin
 Gurovo
 Ilmensky 1-y
 Ilmensky 2-y
 Karagichevsky
 Katasonov
 Knyazhensky 1-y
 Knyazhensky 2-y
 Krutinsky
 Kukushkino
 Kurin
 Malomedvedevsky
 Maly Oreshkin
 Mishin
 Mokhovsky
 Orly
 Otradnoye
 Otruba
 Plotnikov 2-y
 Poddubny
 Prudki
 Razdory
 Rekonstruktsiya
 Rogozhin
 Sekachi
 Semenovod
 Senichkin
 Sennoy
 Sidory
 Starorechensky
 Staroselye
 Stoylovsky
 Strakhovsky
 Subbotin
 Sukhov 1-y
 Sukhov 2-y
 Tishanka
 Troitsky
 Vesyoly
 Yeterevskaya
 Zapolosny
 Zinovyev

Nekhayevsky District 
Rural localities in Nekhayevsky District:

 Artanovsky
 Avraamovsky
 Buratsky
 Denisovsky
 Dinamo
 Dryaglovsky
 Dyakonovsky
 Kamensky
 Karaichevsky
 Khoroshensky
 Krasnopolye
 Krasnovsky
 Kruglovka
 Kulichki
 Kuzminka
 Lobachevsky
 Lukovskaya
 Makhiny
 Markovsky
 Mazinsky
 Melovsky
 Mirny
 Nekhayevskaya
 Nizhnedolgovsky
 Nizhnerechensky
 Olkhovsky
 Ostryakovsky
 Pankinsky
 Pavlovsky
 Pervomaysky
 Potaynoy
 Rodnichki
 Sokolovsky
 Solonka
 Sukhovsky 1-y
 Sychevsky
 Tishanskaya
 Tushkanovsky
 Upornikovskaya
 Uspenka
 Verkhnerechensky
 Zakhopyorsky

Nikolayevsky District 
Rural localities in Nikolayevsky District:

 Baranovka
 Berezhnovka
 Brigady 2
 Brigady 3
 Chkalov
 Dobrinka
 Iskra
 Komsomolets
 Krasnaya Znamya
 Krasny Meliorator
 Kumysolechebnitsa
 Leninets
 Leninskoye
 Levchunovka
 Libknekhta
 Novy Byt
 Ochkurovka
 Oroshayemy
 Peski
 Pioner
 Piramidalny
 Politotdelskoye
 Put Ilyicha
 Razdolnoye
 Rulevoy
 Solodushino
 Stepnovsky
 Talovka
 Torgunsky
 Tselinny
 Zavolzhsky

Novoanninsky District 
Rural localities in Novoanninsky District:

 Alimov-Lyubimovsky
 Alsyapinsky
 Amochayevsky
 Atamanovsky
 Beryozovka 1-ya
 Beryozovka 2-ya
 Bocharovsky
 Bolshoy Dubovsky
 Bolshoy Golovsky
 Borisovsky
 Budennovsky
 Burnatsky
 Chelyshevsky
 Cherkesovsky
 Deminsky
 Drobyazkin
 Durnovsky
 Filonovskaya
 Galushkinsky
 Goslesopitomnik
 Gulyayevsky
 Ivanovsky
 Karpovsky
 Kirpichyovsky
 Kleymenovsky
 Kosovsky
 Kozlinovsky
 Krasnaya Zarya
 Krasnogorsky
 Krasnokorotkovsky
 Kuznetsovsky
 Makhinovsky
 Maly Dubovsky
 Martynovsky
 Novokiyevka
 Novoselsky
 Panfilovo
 Pereshchepnovsky
 Polevoy
 Poltavsky
 Popov
 Popovsky
 Posyolok Uchkhoza Novoanninskogo Selkhoztekhnikuma
 Posyolok otdeleniya 1 sovkhoza AMO
 Posyolok otdeleniya 2 sovkhoza AMO
 Posyolok sovkhoza AMO
 Pyshkinsky
 Rodnikovsky
 Rog-Izmaylovsky
 Rogachev
 Rozhnovsky
 Salomatin
 Satarovsky
 Staroanninskaya
 Strakhovsky
 Talovsky
 Tavolzhansky
 Trostyansky
 Troyetsky
 Trud-Rassvet
 Udodovsky
 Verbochny
 Vesyoly
 Vikhlyayevsky
 Vostochny
 Yaryzhensky
 Yastrebovsky
 Zaprudny
 Zvyozdka

Novonikolayevsky District 
Rural localities in Novonikolayevsky District:

 Aksenov
 Aleksikovsky
 Andreyevsky
 Andrianovsky
 Baklanovsky
 Belorechensky
 Chigari
 Chulinsky
 Duplyatsky
 Dvoynovsky
 Fominsky
 Gosplodopitomnik
 Grachi
 Grudne-Yermaki
 Kamenka
 Khopyorsky
 Kikvidze
 Kirkhinsky
 Kleyevsky
 Komsomolsky
 Korolevsky
 Krasnoarmeysky
 Krasnoluchensky
 Krasnostanovsky
 Kulikovsky
 Kupava
 Kuznetsovsky
 Lashchenovsky
 Lazorevsky
 Mirny
 Mironovsky
 Nikolayevsky
 Nizhnekardailsky
 Nizhnezubrilovsky
 Novoberezovsky
 Novokardailsky
 Orlovsky
 Priovrazhny
 Prutskovsky
 Ruzheynikovsky
 Sapozhok
 Serp i Molot
 Skvorsovsky
 Stepnoy
 Verkhnekardailsky
 Verkhnezubrilovsky

Oktyabrsky District 
Rural localities in Oktyabrsky District:

 Abganerovo
 Aksay
 Antonov
 Chernomorovsky
 Chikov
 Goncharovka
 Gromoslavka
 Ilmen-Suvorovsky
 Ivanovka
 Kamenka
 Kapkinka
 Kovalyovka
 Molokanovsky
 Nizhnekumsky
 Novoaksaysky
 Novoromashkin
 Peregruznoye
 Samokhino
 Shebalino
 Shelestovo
 Sovetsky
 Tikhy
 Vasilyevka
 Verkhnekumsky
 Verkhnerubezhny
 Vodino
 Vodyansky
 Zalivsky
 Zhutovo 1-ye
 Zhutovo 2-ye

Olkhovsky District 
Rural localities in Olkhovsky District:

 Dmitriyevka
 Goskonyushnya
 Gurovo
 Gusyovka
 Kamenny Brod
 Kireyevo
 Klinovka
 Lipovka
 Mikhaylovka
 Nezhinsky
 Novoolkhovka
 Novorossiyskoye
 Oktyabrsky
 Olkhovka
 Peskovatsky
 Pogozhya Balka
 Razuvayev
 Romanovka
 Rybinka
 Shchepkin
 Solodcha
 Stefanidovka
 Studyonovka
 Tishinka
 Yagodnoye
 Zaburunny
 Zakharovka
 Zanzevatka

Pallasovsky District 
Rural localities in Pallasovsky District:

 Bolshoy Simkin
 Chernyshev
 Elton
 Gonchary
 Gormaki
 Kalashniki
 Kalinina
 Kamyshovka
 Karabidayevka
 Karpov
 Kaysatskoye
 Khudushny
 Kobzev
 Komsomolsky
 Korolyovka
 Krasny Oktyabr
 Kulikov
 Kumysolechebnitsa
 Limanny
 Lisunovo
 Maximovka
 Novaya Ivantsovka
 Novostroyka
 Novy
 Otgonny
 Prigarino
 Priozerny
 Prudentov
 Put Ilyicha
 Romanenko
 Romashki
 Sadchikov
 Sakharovka
 Sapunkov
 Savinka
 Segorodsky
 Selyanka
 Smychka
 Staraya Balka
 Staraya Ivantsovka
 Vengelovka
 Vishnevka
 Yershov
 Yesin
 Zalivnoy
 Zavolzhsky
 Zheleznodorozhny razyezd 299
 Zheleznodorozhny razyezd 324
 Zheleznodorozhny razyezd 332
 Zholobov
 Zolotari
 Zyoleny

Rudnyansky District 
Rural localities in Rudnyansky District:

 Barannikovo
 Berezovka
 Bolshoye Sudachye
 Borodayevka
 Gromki
 Ilmen
 Kozlovka
 Krutoye
 Lemeshkino
 Lopukhovka
 Maloye Matyshevo
 Matyshevo
 Matyshevo
 Mityakino
 Novokrasino
 Novy Kondal
 Osichki
 Podkuykovo
 Razlivka
 Russkaya Bundevka
 Sadovy
 Sosnovka
 Stary Kondal
 Tersinka
 Ushinka
 Yagodny
 Yegorovka-na-Medveditse

Serafimovichsky District 
Rural localities in Serafimovichsky District:

 Bazki
 Beryozki
 Blinovsky
 Bobrovsky 1-y
 Bobrovsky 2-y
 Bolshoy
 Buyerak-Popovsky
 Buyerak-Senyutkin
 Chebotarevsky
 Chernopolyansky
 Chumakov
 Druzhilinsky
 Fomikhinsky
 Glubokovsky
 Gorbatovsky
 Grushin
 Gryazinovsky
 Gryaznushkin
 Ignatov
 Izbushensky
 Karagichev
 Kepinsky
 Khokhlachev
 Khovansky
 Kireyevsky
 Kletsko-Pochtovsky
 Korotovsky
 Kotovsky
 Kozinovsky
 Krutovsky
 Kundryuchkin
 Lastushinsky
 Lebyazhy
 Malakhov
 Minayevsky
 Mostovsky
 Nikulichev
 Nizhnyanka
 Novoalexandrovsky
 Novopavlovsky
 Orlinovsky
 Otrozhki
 Perepolsky
 Peschany
 Pichugin
 Pimkin
 Podgorny
 Podolkhovsky
 Podpeshinsky
 Poselsky
 Posyolok otdeleniya 2 sovkhoza Ust-Medveditsky
 Posyolok otdeleniya 3 sovkhoza Ust-Medveditsky
 Prilipkinsky
 Pronin
 Rubashkin
 Rybny
 Sebryakov
 Srednetsaritsynsky
 Starosenyutkin
 Terkin
 Tryasinovsky
 Tyukovnoy
 Ugolsky
 Ust-Khopyorskaya
 Varlamov
 Yagodny
 Yendovsky
 Zatonsky
 Zimnyatsky
 Zimovnoy

Sredneakhtubinsky District 
Rural localities in Sredneakhtubinsky District:

 Bulgakov
 Burkovsky
 Chapayevets
 Gospitomnik
 Kalinina
 Kashirin
 Kilyakovka
 Kirovets
 Kletsky
 Kochetkovo
 Kolkhoznaya Akhtuba
 Krasny Buksir
 Krasny Oktyabr
 Krasny Partizan
 Krasny Sad
 Krasny
 Krivusha
 Kuybyshev
 Lebyazhya Polyana
 Maksima Gorkogo
 Maksima Gorkogo
 Maslovo
 Nevidimka
 Novenky
 Pervomaysky
 Peschanka
 Plamenka
 Prikanalny
 Pryshchevka
 Rakhinka
 Repino
 Rybachy
 Rybovodny
 Sakharny
 Shchuchy
 Shumrovaty
 Stakhanovets
 Standartny
 Starenky
 Sukhodol
 Talovy
 Trety Reshayushchy
 Tretya Karta
 Tumak
 Tutov
 Tyrly
 Veliky Oktyabr
 Verkhnepogromnoye
 Volzhanka
 Vondo
 Vosmoye Marta
 Vtoraya Pyatiletka
 Vyazovka
 Yamy
 Zakutsky
 Zayar
 Zonalny
 Zvyozdny

Staropoltavsky District 
Rural localities in Staropoltavsky District:

 Belokamenka
 Belyayevka
 Bolshiye Prudy
 Cherebayevo
 Fermy 2 plemzavoda Parizhskaya Kommuna
 Fermy 2 sovkhoza Vodyanovsky
 Gmelinka
 Ilovatka
 Kalinino
 Kano
 Kharkovka
 Kolyshkino
 Korshunovka
 Kozhushkino
 Krasny Yar
 Kurnayevka
 Lyatoshinka
 Melovoy
 Nizhnyaya Vodyanka
 Novaya Kvasnikovka
 Novaya Poltavka
 Novy Tikhonov
 Orlinoye
 Pervomaysky
 Peschanka
 Posevnoy
 Posyolok Valuyevskoy Opytno-Meliorativnoy Stantsii
 Saltovo
 Shpaki
 Staraya Poltavka
 Suyetinovka
 Torgun
 Tsvetochnoye
 Valuyevka
 Verbny
 Verkhny Yeruslan
 Verkhnyaya Vodyanka
 Zheleznodorozhny razyezd 1062

Surovikinsky District 
Rural localities in Surovikinsky District:

 Blizhnemelnichny
 Blizhneosinovsky
 Blizhnepodgorsky
 Buratsky
 Chuvilevsky
 Dobrinka
 Dom Otdykha 40 let Oktyabrya
 Kachalin
 Kiselev
 Lobakin
 Lysov
 Mayorovsky
 Nizhneosinovsky
 Nizhnesolonovsky
 Nizhny Chir
 Novoderbenovsky
 Novomaximovsky
 Ostrov
 Ostrovskoy
 Peshcherovsky
 Plesistovsky
 Pogodin
 Popov 1-y
 Popov 2-y
 Posyolok otdeleniya 2 sovkhoza Krasnaya Zvezda
 Posyolok otdeleniya 3 sovkhoza Krasnaya Zvezda
 Rychkovsky
 Savinsky
 Sinyapkinsky
 Skvorin
 Starikovsky
 Staroderbenovsky
 Sukhanovsky
 Suvorovskaya
 Sviridovsky
 Sysoyevsky
 Verkhneaksyonovsky
 Verkhnechirsky
 Verkhneosinovsky
 Verkhnesolonovsky
 Yablonevy
 Zhirkovsky
 Zryanin

Svetloyarsky District 
Rural localities in Svetloyarsky District:

 Abganerovo
 Barbashi
 Bolshiye Chapurniki
 Chapurniki
 Chervlyonoye
 Dubovoye
 Dubovy Ovrag
 Gromki
 Ivanovka
 Kanalnaya
 Kirova
 Krasnoflotsky
 Krasnopartizansky
 Lugovoy
 Malye Chapurniki
 Nariman
 Novosad
 Privolny
 Privolzhsky
 Prudovy
 Raygorod
 Sadovy
 Severny
 Solyanka
 Tinguta
 Trudolyubiye
 Tsatsa

Uryupinsky District 
Rural localities in Uryupinsky District:

 Abroskinsky
 Akchernsky
 Akishin
 Astakhovsky
 Baltinovsky
 Belogorsky
 Bespalovsky
 Besplemyanovsky
 Bolshinsky
 Bryansky
 Bubnovsky
 Bugrovsky
 Bulekovsky
 Cherkassky
 Chumakovsky
 Dobrinka
 Dolgovsky
 Dolgy
 Dubovsky
 Dubrovsky
 Dyakonovsky 1-y
 Dyakonovsky 2-y
 Fedotovsky
 Firsovsky
 Glinkovsky
 Golovsky
 Gorsko-Popovsky
 Gorsky
 Grigoryevsky
 Gromlenovsky
 Iskra
 Kamenka
 Kolesniki
 Kotovsky
 Krasny
 Krasnyansky
 Krepovsky
 Kriushinsky
 Krivovsky
 Kudryashyovsky
 Kukhtinsky
 Loshchinovsky
 Luchnovsky
 Lysogorsky
 Makarovsky
 Mikhaylovskaya
 Mokhovskoy
 Nizhneantoshinsky
 Nizhnebezymyansky
 Nizhnekrasnyansky
 Nizhnesoinsky
 Nizhnetseplyayevsky
 Okladnensky
 Olkhovsky
 Olkhovsky
 Olshanka
 Osipovsky
 Pervomaysky
 Petrovsky
 Podgorinsky
 Podsosensky
 Popov
 Provotorovsky
 Rossoshinsky
 Rozovsky
 Rzhavsky
 Sadkovsky
 Safonovsky
 Saltynsky
 Santyrsky
 Sazonovsky
 Serkovsky
 Serkovsky
 Shemyakinsky
 Skabelinsky
 Stepnoy
 Studyonovsky
 Sychevsky
 Tepikinskaya
 Topolyovsky
 Uchkhoz
 Ukrainsky
 Uvarovsky
 Vdovolsky
 Verkhneantoshinsky
 Verkhnebezymyansky
 Verkhnesoinsky
 Verkhnetseplyayevsky
 Vikhlyantsevsky
 Vishnyakovsky
 Yegorovsky
 Zaburdyayevsky
 Zakhopyorsky
 Zelyony
 Zotov

Yelansky District 
Rural localities in Yelansky District:

 Alyavy
 Babinkino
 Berezovka
 Berezovka
 Bolshevik
 Bolshoy Morets
 Bulgurino
 Dubovoye
 Ivanovka
 Kalachiki
 Khoshchininsky
 Khvoshchinka
 Kiyevka
 Krasnotalovsky
 Krasny
 Krayishevo
 Marinsky
 Morets
 Nabat
 Nikolayevka
 Nosovsky
 Novobuzuluksky
 Novodobrinka
 Novopetrovsky
 Pervokamensky
 Poruchikovsky
 Rodinskoye
 Rovinsky
 Shchelokovka
 Talovka
 Ternovoye
 Tersa
 Toryanoye
 Trostyanka
 Vodopyanovo
 Volkovo
 Vyazovka
 Yereshkovo
 Zelyony
 Zhuravka

Zhirnovsky District 
Rural localities in Zhirnovsky District:

 Aleshniki
 Alexandrovka
 Andreyevka
 Bolshaya Knyazevka
 Borodachi
 Butyrka
 Chizhi
 Fomyonkovo
 Fyodorovka
 Grechikhino
 Klyonovka
 Makarovka
 Medveditsa
 Melovatka
 Melzavod
 Mirny
 Morozovo
 Nedostupov
 Nizhnyaya Dobrinka
 Novaya Bakhmetyevka
 Novinka
 Peskovka
 Podchinny
 Pogranichnoye
 Romanovka
 Serpokrylovo
 Tarapatino
 Teterevyatka
 Verkhnyaya Dobrinka
 Vishnyovoye
 Yershovka
 Zhuravka

See also 
 
 Lists of rural localities in Russia

References 

Volgograd Oblast